Eberhard II may refer to:

 Eberhard II, Count of the Mark, (c. 1255 – 1308)
 Eberhard II, Count of Württemberg (after 1315 – 1392)
 Eberhard II von der Mark (1365–1440)
 Eberhard II, Duke of Württemberg (1447–1504)